George Brush may refer to:
George de Forest Brush (1855–1941), American painter
 George Jarvis Brush (1831–1912), American mineralogist
George W. Brush (1842–1927), American soldier, physician and politician

See also
George Bush (disambiguation)